The 1976–77 season was Port Vale's 65th season of football in the Football League, and their seventh successive season (13th overall) in the Third Division. In the FA Cup, Vale reached the Fifth Round for the first time since 1961–62, after progressing past two Second Division clubs. There they were knocked out by Aston Villa at Villa Park in front of nearly fifty thousand spectators. Back in the league, Vale struggled to get by with an average home attendance of 4,356, and finished nineteenth, just three points from safety. Entered into the Debenhams Cup, they lost 4–3 to Chester.

Overview

Third Division
The pre-season saw manager Roy Sproson add two youngsters to his squad: forward Kevin Kennerley (Burnley) and defender Ian Osborne (Birmingham City). The battle with Stoke-on-Trent City Council continued over the legality of Vale's market trading operation. The club were also in trouble with The Football Association, who fined them £400 for the 47 bookings received in the previous campaign. Vale decided to crack down on player indiscipline by fining players £25 for dissent and £50 for violence. As 'a piece of good business' which 'could not be turned down', the club also sold star defender Terry Lees to Dutch side Sparta Rotterdam for £25,000. Another late signing was Geoff Davies, who had returned from a spell in the United States.

The season opened with a loss, a draw, and then a 2–0 win over Sheffield Wednesday. Then only one point was gained in the next six matches. To bolster the side in came Stoke City's veteran defender Eric Skeels, who was also returning from a spell in the USA. Mick Cullerton then severed a cartilage, which meant five months out of action for the star striker. To replace him Sproson signed Blackburn Rovers' Ken Beamish (£12,000) and Wigan Athletic's John Rogers ('a small fee'). The club also made other clubs aware that they would listen to any offers for players, but there was little in the way of interest. In October, former England and Wolves defender Bobby Thomson was another player returning from the States. Signing with the Vale, he impressed so much that he was made club captain in his first week at Vale Park. A club record run of 42 away games without a clean sheet began on 18 December, and would last until 30 September 1978. The first of this run was a 1–1 draw with Rotherham United at Millmoor, after this match "Millers" boss Jimmy McGuigan stated that Vale showed 'the worst exhibition of football thuggery I have ever seen'. Even though the defence struggled away from home, Beamish did not, as he scored his first ten goals for the club away from Burslem. In a 4–2 win over Grimsby Town at Blundell Park on 3 January, Beamish scored a hat-trick. Later in the month Geoff Davies had his contract cancelled by mutual consent.

Vale's form tailed off, though Terry Alcock returned briefly to play a handful of games. Thomson also returned to the US, Ray Williams was transferred to Northwich Victoria for 'a small fee', and Colin Tartt was sold to Chesterfield for £15,000. In their places were new signings Alan Lamb (£5,000 from Preston North End) and Peter Sutcliffe (£3,000 from Stockport County), whilst a fit again Cullerton was like a new signing. The club had drifted into the bottom four, but a six match unbeaten run with a prolific Cullerton took them to safety. In the background was an ongoing power struggle in the boardroom. In late-March they then received a 6–2 beating at Wrexham and then a 4–0 beating from Chesterfield at Saltergate. The club suffered an injury crisis in April, with both Keith Chadwick and John Brodie having been forced to retire through injury. Relegation was avoided however with six points from the final five games. The final game of the season was against Rotherham United, who needed a six-goal win margin to gain promotion. The match saw three penalties, three bookings and crowd trouble, though United were four goals ahead they failed to find the remaining two, and instead the "Valiants" scored a late goal.

They finished in nineteenth place with 38 points, three points above the drop. Their 47 goals scored tally was lower only than Grimsby's tally. They only recorded two victories on their travels. At the end of the season was the short-lived Debenhams Cup competition, Vale lost 4–3 to Chester over two legs, but still received a runners-up prize of £5,000.

Finances
On the financial side, a loss of £5,959 was made despite a donation of £23,860 from the Development Fund. Gate receipts had risen to £60,115, however wages and signing-on fees had risen to £139,012. The bank overdraft stood at £15,000, though the club's total debt stood at £123,863. On the coaching front, Roy Chapman was replaced by Colin Harper. Meanwhile, three players were handed free transfers: ten-year club veteran Tommy McLaren (Telford United), Eric Skeels (Leek Town), and Ian Osborne (Hillingdon Borough). Also John Rogers was sold to Altrincham for £2,000.

Cup competitions
In the FA Cup, Vale advanced past Fourth Division Southport with a John Rogers brace at Haig Avenue. A 3–0 win over Barnsley then put Vale into the Third Round, where they came up against Second Division Hull City. After a 1–1 draw at Boothferry Park, Vale knocked the "Tigers" out with a 3–1 win at Vale Park. The "Valiants" beat Burnley – another second-tier team – in the Fourth Round with a 2–1 home win. The Fifth Round held First Division Aston Villa at Villa Park. Villa won 3–0 in front of a crowd of 46,872. The score was 'flattering' to the "Villans" as they scored two late goals. The match was shown on television.

The club's FA Cup run earned them a place in the Debenhams Cup final, against Chester. A 2–0 home win in the first leg gave them a strong advantage heading to Sealand Road, but there they lost 4–1 and so had to be consoled with runners-up medals and £5,000 prize money.

In the League Cup, Welsh club Wrexham knocked the Vale out 2–1 on aggregate, following a 1–1 draw in Burslem and a 1–0 win at the Racecourse Ground.

League table

Results
Port Vale's score comes first

Football League Third Division

Results by matchday

Matches

FA Cup

League Cup

Debenhams Cup

Player statistics

Appearances

Top scorers

Transfers

Transfers in

Transfers out

Loans in

Loans out

References
Specific

General

Port Vale F.C. seasons
Port Vale